Jean Racine (1639–1699) was a French dramatist.

Racine may also refer to:

Music
Racine (band), a band fronted by Wendy James
Racine (album), a 1992 album by Sass Jordan
Rasin or racine, a Haitian musical movement
Racine carrée, an album by Stromae
Racine 2, an album by Racine

Places
Racine Nunatak, Antarctica
Racine, Quebec, Canada
Racine (Casablanca), Morocco
Racine, Minnesota, U.S.
Racine, Missouri, U.S.
Racine, Ohio, U.S.
Racine, West Virginia, U.S.
Racine, Wisconsin, U.S.
Racine County, Wisconsin, U.S.

Rail stations
Racine Avenue station
Racine Depot
Racine station (CTA Blue Line), a station on the Chicago Transit Authority's 'L' system, serving the Blue Line
Racine station (CTA Green Line), a defunct rapid transit station on the Chicago Transit Authority's Green Line

Other uses
Mont Racine, a peak in the Jura Mountains
Racine Belles, a former team in the All-American Girls Professional Baseball League
Racine Danish Kringles, a bakery
Racine Dominican Sisters, a Catholic religious institute for women
Racine stages, commonly used to score seizure severity in animal models of epilepsy
Racine Zoo
USS Racine (LST-1191)

People with the surname
Albert Racine (1907–1984), American Blackfoot artist
Antoine Racine (1822-1893), Canadian Roman Catholic priest
Bruce Racine (born 1966), Canadian former professional hockey goaltender
Bruno Racine (born 1951), French administrator and writer
Dominique Racine (1828-1888), Canadian Roman Catholic priest
Doug Racine (born 1952), former Vermont State Senator
Horace Racine (1905-1994), Canadian politician
Jean-François Racine (born 1982), ice hockey goaltender
Jean-Paul Racine (1928–1988), Canadian politician
Jonathan Racine (born 1993), Canadian professional ice hockey player
Karl Racine (born 1962), attorney general of the District of Columbia
Louis Racine (1692–1763), French poet, the son of Jean Racine
René Racine (born 1939), Québécois Canadian astronomer
Serge Racine (born 1951), Haitian football defender 
Yves Racine (born 1969), Canadian former professional ice hockey player

People with the first name
Racine Coly (born 1995), Senegalese professional footballer

See also
Jean Racine (disambiguation)
Racines (disambiguation)